The Masfout Club Stadium is an association football stadium in Masfout, United Arab Emirates, with a capacity of 3,000. It's primarily used by Masfout CSC.

References

Football venues in the United Arab Emirates